Cristina Yvonne Rémond (born 1980) was Canada's representative at the Miss Universe 2001 pageant. She grew up in Montreal, Canada.

In 2001, she represented Canada at the Miss Universe 2001 pageant in Puerto Rico earning 12th place.

External links

1980 births
21st-century Canadian civil servants
Canadian anthropologists
Canadian women anthropologists
Canadian people of Hungarian descent
Carleton University alumni
French Quebecers
Harvard Divinity School alumni
Immigration and Refugee Board of Canada
Living people
Miss Universe 2001 contestants
Miss Universe Canada winners
People from Montreal